Lieutenant General Sean MacEoin (1910–1998), also known as John McKeown, was an officer in the Irish Defence Forces.

Early life 
MacEoin on was born in the Cooley Peninsula in Co Louth.

Military career 
He joined the Irish Army as a cadet in 1930.

He served as a battalion commander during The Emergency. After the war, he held appointments in an infantry and cadet school.  He was appointed commandant of the Irish Military College in 1957. In January 1960, he was appointed the Irish Defence Forces Chief of Staff. He was the first graduate of the Irish Military College to have the role.

In 1961, he was appointed as the Force Commander of the United Nations Operation in the Congo, which was considered a great honour for the Irish Defence Forces, he commanded it during some of the fiercest fighting of the Congo Crisis. He found himself in command of 20,000 troops of many different nationalities including Irish, Swedish, Indian, Ethiopian and Ghanaian, among which he was held in high regard. U Thant, the United Nations Secretary General said General MacEoin had "discharged his duties with eminence", and he was awarded a Distinguished Service Medal.  On his return to Ireland, he took over his role as Chief of Staff of the Defence Forces. The emergence of The Troubles in 1969 left the Irish Army somewhat overstretched. 

He retired as chief of staff of the Irish Defence Forces in 1971.

Death
MacEoin died at his home in Dublin in 1998, aged 88. The removal was from his residence to Good Shepherd Church, Churchtown, Dublin on 31 July, and the funeral Mass took place on 1 August, and he was buried at Bothar na Breinne, Rathfarnham. He had three sons and one daughter.

References

1910 births
1998 deaths
Irish Army generals
People from County Louth
Military personnel from County Louth
Chiefs of Staff of the Defence Forces (Ireland)